Davud Majid ogly Nasibov was an Azerbaijani poet, translator, member of the
Union of Azerbaijani Writers since 1969, laureate of Lenin Komsomol Prize of the Azerbaijan SSR (1984) and of Lenin Komsomol Prize (1986).

Biography
Davud Nasib was born in Qazax on 25 August 1942. 

Nasib received his primary and secondary education in high school #2 of Qazax. He entered the Baku State University Librarian-information Faculty in 1959. His first work - a poem My Native River – My Kura was published in 1956, in Victory Flag newspaper in Qazax. Since then Nasib actively began writing poems.

He also made artistic translations of the poetry of the Soviet Union nations. Davud Nasib translated poems of the Hungarian poet Miklós Radnóti into Azerbaijani. His books named Letters to Mother and Furnace stones were released by the Moscow publishing house Sovetsky Pisatel respectively in 1974 and 1981.

In 1966-1969 Nasib worked as an editor in the Art Department of the State Committee for Television and Radio Broadcasting of the Azerbaijan SSR. Then he completed a two-year higher literature course at the Union of Soviet Writers in Moscow (1971-1972). After graduation, he returned to Baku, worked as a literary employee in the editorial office of the "Literature and Art" newspaper, head of the Fine Arts Department, and then headed the Poetry Department here. He was a member of the Presidium of the Union of Azerbaijani Writers. In 1978-1980 Nasib was on a creative vacation to the Hungarian People's Republic.

Davud Nasib died on March 26, 2003 in an automobile accident.

Family 
Davud Nasib was married, with two children named Khayal and Khayyam. His father was killed in the Great Patriotic War.

Bibliography (selection)
 Bir ömrün salnaməsi (Chronicle of a lifetime) // New Azerbaijan, 2001.
 Sığındım (I took refuge) // Literary newspaper, 2012.
 Ata (Father) // Literary newspaper, 2014.

References

External links
Official website

1942 births
2003 deaths
People from Qazax
Baku State University alumni
Azerbaijani poets
Soviet poets
Azerbaijani male poets
Soviet male writers
20th-century male writers
Azerbaijani translators
Recipients of the Lenin Komsomol Prize
Road incident deaths in Azerbaijan